John J. Karras (January 29, 1928 – November 6, 2008) was an American football halfback who played one season with the Chicago Cardinals of the National Football League. He was drafted by the Chicago Cardinals in the second round of the 1952 NFL Draft. Karras had previously played college football at the University of Illinois at Urbana–Champaign and attended Argo Community High School in Summit, Illinois. He was a Consensus All-American in 1951.

College career
Karras first enrolled at the University of Illinois as a freshman in 1946 and then spent 18 months in the United States Army holding the rank of private first class. He returned to Illinois in 1949, accumulating seven rushing touchdowns and 826 yards rushing. He led the Illinois Fighting Illini football team in rushing yards in 1950 and 1951. Karras was a Consensus All-American in 1951 after gaining 716 yards rushing and scoring 13 touchdowns. Illinois went 16-3-1 and won the 1952 Rose Bowl against Stanford. In 1990, he was named to Illinois' All-Century team.

Professional career
Karras was drafted by the Chicago Cardinals with the sixteenth pick in the 1952 NFL Draft.

References

External links
Just Sports Stats

1928 births
2008 deaths
Players of American football from Chicago
American football halfbacks
Illinois Fighting Illini football players
Chicago Cardinals players
All-American college football players
United States Army soldiers